The 2011–12 Rayo Vallecano season was the club's 78th season in history and its 13th season in La Liga, the top division of Spanish football, following promotion after finishing as runners-up in the Segunda División.  It covers a period from 1 July 2011 to 30 June 2012.

Rayo Vallecano will compete for their second La Liga title and will enter the Copa del Rey in the Round of 32.

Players

Squad information
Updated 3 September 2010.

Transfers

In

Total expenditure:  €0 million

Out

 
Total income:  €1.7 million

Club

Coaching staff

Competitions

La Liga

League table

Results summary

Results by round

Matches

Copa del Rey

See also

2011–12 Copa del Rey
2011–12 La Liga

External links
 

Rayo Vallecano
Rayo Vallecano seasons